Galkantai (formerly) is a village in Kėdainiai district municipality, in Kaunas County, in central Lithuania. According to the 2011 census, the village had a population of 12 people.

History
Galkantai has been known since the 17th century. At the end of the 19th century it was a property of the Wejsberg, Ławrynowycz and Pietrusiewicz families in the former Sirutiškis manor property.

Demography

References

Villages in Kaunas County
Kėdainiai District Municipality